The following is a list of radio stations in New Zealand.

New Zealand network stations 

Several networks operate across multiple centres or nationwide. Most have resulted from the consolidation of a group of existing stations and many have changed their name over time. The Sound was previously Solid Gold. TAB Trackside, suspended operations 12 April 2020, was previously LiveSport, BSport and Radio Pacific.  SENZ launched on 19 July 2021 on the former TAB Trackside frequencies. Mix (formerly Mix 98.2), was a reincarnation of Easy Mix, Viva and Easy Listening, and Radio Sport was replaced by Gold on 1 July 2020. The now-defunct Kiwi FM was previously Channel Z. The Wolf also no longer operates.

Local FM/AM/Internet stations

See also 
Call signs in New Zealand

References

External links